National Shrine of Saint Jude may refer to:

 National Shrine of Saint Jude (England)
 National Shrine of Saint Jude (United States)
 National Shrine of Saint Jude (Philippines)